Helinand may refer to:

Helinand of Froidmont (fl. c. 1150 – c. 1230), monk, poet and chronicler
Helinand of Laon, bishop (1052–1096)
Helinand of Perseigne (fl. c. 1200), monk and theologian

See also
Elinand, Prince of Galilee